Fine Town Hall is a historic town hall building located at Fine in St. Lawrence County, New York. It was built about 1884 and is a two-story, rectangular shaped frame building with a corrugated metal roof and stone foundation, 35 feet wide and 75 feet long.

It was listed on the National Register of Historic Places in 1996.

References

City and town halls on the National Register of Historic Places in New York (state)
Houses completed in 1884
Buildings and structures in St. Lawrence County, New York
National Register of Historic Places in St. Lawrence County, New York